The German School Bucharest, or of  Bucharest, may refer to:

 Deutsche Schule Bukarest (est. 2007) – German-language international school
 German Goethe College Bucharest (est. 1752) – Bukarest's historical German school; see  and 
 Hermann Oberth International German School (est. 2016) – recent private school in Voluntari (1 km outside Bucharest, commonly viewed as a suburb); see www.scoala-germana.ro/en
 Zeppelin Schule (est. 2012) – private school; see www.zeppelinschule.ro

See also
 German School
 German Embassy School (disambiguation)
 German International School (disambiguation)